William Harbutt (13 February 1844 – 1 June 1921) was a British artist and the inventor of Plasticine.

Early life
Born in North Shields, England, the son of Thomas Harbutt (5 August 1803 – 1880)  and Elizabeth Whitehouse Jefcoate (27 June 1804 – 1883), Harbutt studied at the National Art Training School in London, and eventually became an associate of the Royal College of Art.

Career
He was headmaster of the Bath School of Art and Design from 1874 to 1877, and then opened his own art school at The Paragon Art Studio, 15 Bladud Buildings, Bath with his wife Elizabeth (Bessie), a well-known miniature portrait artist who exhibited works at the Royal Academy of Art and the Chicago World's Fair, and in 1887 was commissioned by Queen Victoria to produce portraits of herself and her late husband Prince Albert.

Plasticine
Harbutt invented Plasticine around 1897 as a non-drying modelling clay for use by his students. At the time he was living in Hartley House, 37 Belvedere, Lansdown Road, Bath, BA1 5HR; later moving to The Grange, High Street, Bathampton.  In 1899 Harbutt was awarded a trade mark, and in 1900 a factory was set up at nearby Bathampton to manufacture the product for commercial sale. Harbutt travelled widely to promote the product, and his theories about the teaching of art by allowing children free expression.

Personal life
Harbutt was also a councillor on Bath rural district council and Bathampton parish council. He was a member of Bath New Church Society which followed the teachings of Emanuel Swedenborg,

He and Bessie had seven children, six of whom survived infancy and worked in the family business. The Harbutt company, owned and run by Harbutt's descendants, continued to manufacture Plasticine in Bathampton until 1983.

Death
He died of pneumonia while on a trip to New York City in 1921.

Memorials
The Paradise in Plasticine garden, a creation of journalist and presenter James May displayed at the 2009 Chelsea Flower Show included a bust of Harbutt sculpted by Jane McAdam Freud.

His home town of North Shields attempted to commemorate his legacy, in 2009, by commissioning some street furniture to resemble plasticine shapes and colour, made out of concrete.    Unfortunately these had to be removed shortly after installation due to complaints from the public, as the street furniture retained pools of water in the seats after rain rendering them unusable or the user getting wet. In addition they were not comfortable or practical and very problematic for elderly or infirm members of the public to get in to and up from. The 'plasticine' chairs were relocated throughout the region to less commercial areas including to the grounds of a local sixth form college, and repainted from the plain plasticine colours to various colour schemes and designs. These remain in place (if rarely used or occupied). Traditional metal street furniture replaced the 'plasticine' furniture in the town centre of his birthplace.

References

1844 births
1921 deaths
Alumni of Bath School of Art and Design
Alumni of the Royal College of Art
People from North Shields
English Swedenborgians
Associates of the Royal College of Art